Teldix GmbH was a significant German aircraft electronics (military avionics) company, in the field of aircraft navigation.

History
It was established in 1960 by Telefunken and Bendix Corporation (USA). Another company similar at the time was Ottico Meccanica Italiana (OMI), of Italy.
In 1973 Teldix was acquired by Robert Bosch GmbH and became part of their division "Kommunikationstechnik - Bosch Telecom" on july 1989. In 2005, the company was acquired by Rockwell Collins.

Aviation
In the late 1960s it made Head-Up Displays for fighter aircraft. It was partly responsible for the head-up display of the Panavia Tornado. Among other things, Teldix supplied gyroscopes and accelerometers for the HAWK anti-aircraft missile of the German Federal Armed Forces.

The company developed much of the electronics for the Eurofighter Typhoon, notably its Defensive Aids Computer (DAC).

Automotive
In the early 1970s it developed an anti-skid (ABS) system for Porsche, BMW and Mercedes-Benz. This was the first commercial-available anti-lock braking system in 1978.

Structure
It was headquartered at Grenzhöfer Weg 36 in Wieblingen, Heidelberg, in Baden-Württemberg, off the L637 road, north of the junction of the Bundesautobahn 656 and Bundesautobahn 5.

Products
 Air navigation equipment
 Anti-lock braking systems (it invented them)
 Moving map displays for aircraft

See also
 Acronyms and abbreviations in avionics

References

Aircraft component manufacturers of Germany
Vehicle safety technologies
Avionics companies
Companies based in Heidelberg
Defunct technology companies of Germany
Technology companies established in 1960

de:Teldix